The Crestview Local School District is a public school district serving Columbiana and other parts of northeastern Columbiana County in the U.S. state of Ohio.

Crestview High School is the only high school in the district.  The schools' sports teams are nicknamed the "Rebels". The district's colors are yellow and black.

Schools currently in operation by the school district

References 

Education in Columbiana County, Ohio
School districts in Ohio
Public schools in Ohio